Gymnodiptychus pachycheilus is a species of cyprinid in the genus Gymnodiptychus. It inhabits the Yellow and Yangtze rivers of China and has a maximum length of 60.0 cm (23.6 inches). It is considered harmless to humans.

References

Cyprinidae
Taxa named by Solomon Herzenstein
Cyprinid fish of Asia
Freshwater fish of China